Joseph Bulovas (born January 9, 1999) is an American football placekicker for the Vanderbilt Commodores of the Southeastern Conference (SEC). Originally from Mandeville, Louisiana, he previously attended the University of Alabama, where he was a part of two College Football Playoff national championship teams.

Recruiting
Joseph was a three-star recruit and received offers from Army, Mississippi State, Alabama, Georgia Tech, Air Force, Tulane, Louisiana, Southeastern Louisiana, and UTSA. He originally committed to Georgia Tech on January 10, 2016, but decommitted more than a year later on January 23, 2017. On January 25, 2017, just two days later, he committed to Alabama.

College career

2017 season
He redshirted this year. Alabama won its 17th national championship against Georgia, 26-23.

2018 season
During his redshirt freshman year, Joseph assumed the kickoff duties and played 15 games as the placekicker. In 2018 he took 18 field goal attempts and made 14 of them with a long of 49 yards against Mississippi State. He also made 75 PATs. He produced a total of 117 points.

2019 season
During his sophomore year, Bulovas played in 11 games and started 9 of those games as the placekicker. During 2019 he made 8 field goals off of 11 attempts with a long of 43 yards and also made 59 PATs. He produced a total of 83 points.

Missed Field Goal against Auburn
During their last game of the year against Auburn Tigers football, Bulovas had a field goal opportunity to tie the game at 48 with a 30-yard field goal attempt with 2:04 left on the clock. He hit it off of the upright, and Alabama would go on to lose 48–45.

That game essentially ended their playoff hopes as they were ranked #5 in the country before the game began.

Bulovas came out publicly with an apology after the game on Twitter. "I just want to express my apologies to the Crimson Tide nation... that is a kick I should make in my sleep".

2020 season
Bulovas did not see the field for Alabama through 13 games. Alabama won its 18th national championship against Ohio State by a score of 52-24.

Transfer
After the season had finished, Bulovas placed his name into the transfer portal as a graduate transfer. In February 2021, Bulovas announced that he would be transferring to the Vanderbilt Commodores.

2021 season
Bulovas appeared in all 12 games for the Commodores, who ended with a record of 2-10. He attempted 19 field goals and made 14 of them with a long of 53 yards. He was perfect in extra points making 15 out of 15.

References

External links
 Alabama Crimson Tide bio

1999 births
Living people
People from Mandeville, Louisiana
American football placekickers
Alabama Crimson Tide football players
Vanderbilt Commodores football players